The paradox of enrichment is a term from population ecology coined by Michael Rosenzweig in 1971.  He described an effect in six predator–prey models where increasing the food available to the prey caused the predator's population to destabilize. A common example is that if the food supply of a prey such as a rabbit is overabundant, its population will grow unbounded and cause the predator population (such as a lynx) to grow unsustainably large. That may result in a crash in the population of the predators and possibly lead to local eradication or even species extinction.

The term 'paradox' has been used since then to describe this effect in slightly conflicting ways. The original sense was one of irony; by attempting to increase the carrying capacity in an ecosystem, one could fatally imbalance it. Since then, some authors have used the word to describe the difference between modelled and real predator–prey interactions.

Rosenzweig used ordinary differential equation models to describe changes in prey populations. Enrichment was taken to be increasing the prey carrying capacity and showing that the prey population destabilized, usually into a limit cycle.

The cycling behavior after destabilization was more thoroughly explored in a subsequent paper (May 1972) and discussion (Gilpin and Rosenzweig 1972).

Support and possible solutions to the paradox 
Many studies have been done on the paradox of enrichment since Rosenzweig. There is empirical support for the paradox of enrichment, mainly from small scale laboratory experiments, but limited support from field observations. as summarised by Roy and Chattopadhyay 
, such as these exceptions:

Inedible prey: if there are multiple prey species and not all are edible, some may absorb nutrients and stabilise cyclicity.
Invulnerable prey: even with a single prey species, if there is a degree of temporal or spatial refuge (the prey can hide from the predator), destabilisation may not happen.
Unpalatable prey: if prey do not fulfil the nutritional preferences of the predator to as great an extent at higher densities, as with some algae and grazers, there may be a stabilising effect.
Ratio dependent functional response. The presence of the paradox is depends on the assumption of the prey dependence of the functional response. The Arditi–Ginzburg model, which uses a ratio dependent functional response, does not show the paradoxical behaviour.
Spatial interactions or spatio-temporal chaos. The model for enrichment assumes that there is no spatial heterogeneity. Spatial version predator-prey models allow for spatial heterogeneity of predator and prey populations in different locations which can reduce the violent oscillations of the non spatial model. If a spatiotemporally chaotic, heterogeneous environment is introduced, cyclic patterns may not arise.
Inducable defense: if there is a predation-dependent response from prey species, it may act to decelerate the downward swing of population caused by the boom in predator population. An example is of Daphnia and  fish predators.
Density dependent predator mortality:  if predator density cannot increase in proportion to that of prey, destabilising periodicities may not develop.
Prey toxicity: if there is a significant cost to the predator of consuming the (now very dense) prey species, predator numbers may not increase sufficiently to give periodicity.

Link with Hopf bifurcation

The paradox of enrichment can be accounted for by the bifurcation theory. As the carrying capacity increases, the equilibrium of the dynamical system becomes unstable.

The bifurcation can be obtained by modifying the Lotka–Volterra equation. First, one assumes that the growth of the prey population is determined by the logistic equation. Then, one assumes that predators have a nonlinear functional response, typically of type II. The saturation in consumption may be caused by the time to handle the prey or satiety effects.

Thus, one can write the following (normalized) equations:

x is the prey density;
y is the predator density;
K is the prey population's carrying capacity;
γ and δ are predator population's parameters (rate of decay and benefits of consumption, respectively).

The term  represents the prey's logistic growth, and  the predator's functional response.

The intersections of the isoclines yields three steady-states:

The first steady-state corresponds to the extinction of both predator and prey, the second one to the predator-free steady-state and the third to co-existence, which only exists when  is sufficiently small.  The predator-free steady-state is locally linearly unstable if and only if the coexistence-steady-state exists.

By the Hartman–Grobman theorem, one can determine the stability of the steady states by approximating the nonlinear system by a linear system.

It is possible to find the exact solution of this linear system, but here, the only interest is in the qualitative behavior. If both eigenvalues of the community matrix have negative real part, then by the stable manifold theorem the system converges to a limit point. Since the determinant is equal to the product of the eigenvalues and is positive, both eigenvalues have the same sign. Since the trace is equal to the sum of the eigenvalues, the co-existence steady-state is locally linearly stable if

At that critical value of the parameter K, the system undergoes a Hopf bifurcation. It comes as counterintuitive (hence the term 'paradox') because increasing the carrying capacity of the ecological system beyond a certain value leads to dynamic instability and extinction of the predator species.

See also 
 Braess's paradox: Adding extra capacity to a network may reduce overall  performance.
 Paradox of the pesticides: Applying pesticide may increase the pest population.

References

Other reading

Mathematical and theoretical biology
Predation